The Fernmeldeturm Münster (Telecommunication Tower Münster) or, colloquial: "Fernsehturm" (TV-Tower) is the modern landmark of Münster completed in 1985/86. The  tower, which is used for directional services and TV-, VHF- and UHF-transmission is not accessible to the public. The basket of this tower, which carries also the name "Münster 42" has a diameter of 40 metres and is situated at a height of 108 metres.

Fernmeldeturm Münster, which has a weight of 14,000 tons, is property of the Deutsche Telekom.

See also
List of amateur radio repeater sites in Germany
List of Towers

References

External links
 

Towers completed in 1986
Buildings and structures in Münster
Communication towers in Germany
1986 establishments in West Germany